The Northeast China Plain, commonly known as Songliao Plain or the Manchurian Plain or just the Northeast Plain, is located in Northeast China, historically also known as Manchuria. It lies between the Greater and Lesser Khingan and Changbai mountains, ending at the coast at Liaodong Bay in the Bohai Sea. Covering 350,000 km2, it is China's largest plain, with an elevation of lower than 200 meters, and less than 100 meters to the southwest. The Songhua, Nen, and Liao rivers run through it. The Manchurian Plain of Asia is the other name of the Amur valley.

The Northeast Plain includes Songnen Plain in the north, Liaohe Plain in the south, and Sanjiang Plain in the northeast. The Songnen plain was formed by the Songhua and alluvial soils from the Nen. The Liaohe plain, located in the hilly areas near Changchun, was created by the separation of watersheds of the Songhua and Liaohe, which are collectively known as the Liaohe plain. The Sanjiang plain, at the confluence of the Sungari, Amur, and Ussuri rivers, was originally a swamp known as the "Great Northern Wilderness", becoming a food-producing area after reclamation. The original wetland area of the Sanjiang plain has been greatly reduced.

History 
The Northeast Plain was inhabited by Sushen ethnic groups since the Zhou Dynastic period, up to and including the Jurchen people, who were semi-nomadic. Large scale Han migration occurred during the Qing dynasty, in a process called Chuang Guandong, intensifying during the reign of Guangxu Emperor in the late 18th century, and bringing with them large scale agriculture.

Agriculture
It is suitable for mechanized farming, with thick and fertile soil and extensive amounts of arable land. The plain is a major Chernozem-producing region of the world. Huge areas are planted with wheat, corn, soybeans, rice, sugar beets, sunflowers, sorghum, and flax. The landscape is rich in resources such as iron ore, coal, and oil. After 1949, land reclamation began on the plain and state farms were established. There are very few trees on this landscape that have not been planted, typically poplars in long rows along roads, or on either side of the train tracks. There are not many fences on the landscape, no long running fences, though there are many wooden or stone fences adjacent to the houses. There is also much wetland, vast marshes, and many areas that are subject to flooding.

References

External links
 ISEE Newsletter, Vol.9, No. 4
 Major land-type categories of China

Plains of China
Geography of Northeast China
Manchuria
Inner Asia
Regions of China